Xyris gracilis, commonly known as slender yellow-eye, is a species of flowering plant in the family Xyridaceae and is endemic to eastern Australia. It is a tufted herb with linear leaves with 5 to 8 flowering stems with bright yellow flowers.

Description
Flowering occurs in December and January.

Taxonomy
Xyris gracilis was first formall described in 1810 by Robert Brown in Prodromus Florae Novae Hollandiae et Insulae Van Diemen. The specific epithet (gracilis) means "slender".

Distribution and habitat
Slender yellow-eye grows in mosit or swampy areas, often in heath, and is widespread on the coast and ranges of New South Wales and southern Victoria.

References

gracilis
Flora of New South Wales
Flora of Victoria (Australia)
Plants described in 1810
Taxa named by Robert Brown (botanist, born 1773)